The Anglican Diocese of North West Australia (known as the Anglican Diocese of Northern Australia until 1961) is a diocese of the Anglican Church of Australia, founded in 1910. It is situated in the northern part of the state of Western Australia, Australia. As part of the Province of Western Australia, it covers those parts of the state north of Perth including Geraldton, Karratha and Broome and is geographically the largest Anglican diocese in Australia and the largest land-based diocese in the world. The diocese has 18 parishes and three Mission to Seafarers’ ministries; the cathedral church of the diocese is the Cathedral of the Holy Cross, Geraldton.

The incumbent bishop of the diocese is the Right Reverend Darrell Parker, formerly Vicar of St Paul's Tamworth, was elected as the 8th bishop in September 2022, replacing Gary Nelson who had retired retired on 15 May 2022. Parker was consecrated in St Andrew's Cathedral, Sydney on 3 February 2023 and installed as bishop in the diocesan cathedral on 15 February 2023.

Structure and churchmanship
The diocese has 18 parishes and three Mission to Seafarers’ ministries and the cathedral church of the diocese is the Cathedral of the Holy Cross, Geraldton.
The diocese is noted for its low church conservative Evangelical stance; no women serve as priests.

History
The diocese covering 2 million km² of Western Australia, north of Perth, is geographically the largest Anglican diocese in Australia and the largest land-based diocese in the world. The population of the area of about 150,000 people.
The Diocese of Perth was established in 1857, but the Diocese of Northern Australia (which became known by the present name in 1961) was not brought into existence until 1910. Broome was the original the seat of the Diocese, from 1910 to 1965, with the Church of the Annunciation the pro-cathedral.

Cathedral
The cathedral church of the diocese is the Cathedral of the Holy Cross, Geraldton located in Cathedral Avenue, Geraldton.

The cathedral building was built in 1964 to a design by architects McDonald and Whitaker. The brick modernist style building has a star shaped footprint and is said to resemble Coventry Cathedral in England. Internally the cathedral has extensive stained glass and an organ built by Allen Organ Company.

Deans of the Cathedral have included:
1969–1974: Brian Kyme  (later assistant bishop in Perth)
2003–2013: Jeremy Rice
2015–2020: Peter Grice (Bishop of Rockhampton from 2021)
2022-present: Lachlan Edwards (previously Rector of Christ Church, Lavender Bay)

List of bishops

Assistant bishops

Bernard Buckland was Regional Bishop for The Kimberleys (assistant bishop) until his retirement on 14 March 1997.

Structure
Due to the fluid nature of our region, we’re proud to be a ‘missionary’ diocese. We journey with everyone who comes and goes as part of work or tourism, and see a congregation turnover rate of around 100% every two years. Our region is dependent on support by individuals, parishes, dioceses, and Christian organisations across Australia who are committed to gospel ministry in small, remote, and isolated towns and communities in North West Australia.

Anglican realignment
The Diocese of North West Australia was the second in the Anglican Church of Australia, after the Anglican Diocese of Sydney, to recognize the Anglican Church in North America as a "member church of the Anglican Communion, in full communion with Diocese of North West Australia", according to a motion passed in October 2014.

See also
Anglican Diocese of Sydney
Anglican Diocese of Tasmania
Anglican Diocese of Armidale
Anglican Pacifist Fellowship
Church Missionary Society
Anglicare
Evangelical Anglicanism
Low church
Calvinism
Fellowship of Confessing Anglicans
GAFCON

References

External links 

  – official site

 
North West Australia
1910 establishments in Australia
Province of Western Australia
Anglican realignment dioceses
Evangelical Anglicanism
Evangelicalism in Australia